Thai temple art and architecture is the art and architecture of Buddhist temples in Thailand. Temples are known as wats, from the Pāḷi vāṭa, meaning "enclosure". A temple has an enclosing wall that divides it from the secular world.

Architecture
Wat architecture adheres to consistent principles. A wat, with few exceptions, consists of two parts: the Phutthawat and the Sangkhawat.

Phutthawat
The Phutthawat is the area which is dedicated to Buddha. It generally contains several buildings:
Chedi – also known as a Stupa it is mostly in the form of a bell-shaped tower, often accessible and covered with gold leaf, containing a relic chamber.
Prang – the Thai version of Khmer temple towers, mostly in temples from the Sukhothai and the Ayutthaya period.
Ubosot or Bot ( or ) – the ordination hall and most sacred area of a wat. Eight Sema stones (Bai Sema) mark the consecrated area.
Wihan – a shrine hall that contains the principal Buddha images. It is the assembly hall where monks and laypeople congregate.
Mondop - specific square- or cruciform-based building or shrine, sometimes with a spired roof. It is a ceremonial form that can be appear on different kinds of buildings. It can house relics, sacred scriptures or act as a shrine. Unlike the Mandapa of Khmer or Indian temple, which are part of a larger structure, the Thai Mondop is free-standing.
Ho trai – the temple library or scriptures depository houses the sacred Tipiṭaka scriptures. Sometimes they are built in the form of a Mondop, a cubical-shaped building where the pyramidal roof is carried by columns.
Sala – an open pavilion providing shade and a place to rest.
Sala kan parian – a large, open hall where laity can hear sermons or receive religious education. It literally means "hall, in which monks study for their Parian exam" and is used for chanting afternoon prayers.
Ho rakhang – bell tower that is used for waking the monks and to announce the morning and evening ceremonies.
Phra rabiang – a peristyle sometimes built around the sacred inner area as a cloister.
Ancillary buildings such as a crematorium or a school.

The buildings are often adorned with elements such as chofas.

In temples of the Rattanakosin era, such as Wat Pho and Wat Ratchabophit, the ubosot can be contained within a (low) inner wall called a Kamphaeng Kaeo, which translates to "crystal wall".

Sangkhawat

The sangkhawat contains the monks' living quarters. It lies within the wall surrounding the temple compound. The sangkhawat can have the following buildings:

Kuti – originally a small structure, built on stilts, designed to house a monk, with its proper size defined in the Sangkhathiset, rule 6, to be 12 by 7 kheup (4.013 by 2.343 meters). Modern kutis take the shape of an apartment building with small rooms.
The sangkhawat can contain the 'Ho rakhang' (bell tower) and even the 'Sala Kan Parian' (sermon hall).
Houses most of the functional buildings such as the kitchen.

Temple elements

Roof forms
Temples display multiple roof tiers. The use of ornamented tiers is reserved for roofs on temples, palaces and important public buildings. Two or three tiers are most often used, but some royal temples have four. The practice is more aesthetic than functional. Temple halls and their roofs are large. To lighten the roof's appearance, the lowest tier is the largest with a smaller middle layer and the smallest tier on top. Multiple breaks in each roof lighten it further – a double-tiered roof might have 2–4 breaks in each tier. The tiers, breaks and tier patterns create dynamic visual rhythms. In northern temples, the roof area is larger, sweeping low to cover more of the wall. The lower tiers telescope toward the entrance. In a central Thai temple, the lower tiers reach a short distance beyond the top roof at the gable ends.

Roof finials
Most decorations are attached to the bargeboard, the long, thin panel on the edge of the roof at the gable ends. The decorative structure is called the lamyong. The lamyong is sculpted in an undulating, serpentine nag sadung shape evoking the Nāga. Its blade-like projection called bai raka suggest both Nāga fins and the feathers of Garuda. Its lower finial is called a hang hong, which usually takes the form of a Nāga's head turned up and facing away from the roof. The Nāga head may be styled in flame-like kranok motifs and may have multiple heads. A roof with multiple breaks or tiers has identical hang hong finials at the bottom of each section. Perched on the peak of the lamyong is the large curving ornament called a Chofah, which resembles the beak of a bird, perhaps representing Garuda.

Popular temple icons
Thai Theravada Buddhism and Hindu cultures merged, and Hindu elements were introduced into Thai iconography. Popular figures include the four-armed figure of Vishnu; the garuda (half man, half bird); the eight-armed Shiva; elephant-headed Ganesh; the Nāga, which appears as a snake, dragon or cobra; and the ghost-banishing giant Yaksha.

See also

Depictions of the Buddha
Development of the Buddha image in Thailand
Iconography of Gautama Buddha in Laos and Thailand
Characteristics of a Thai Buddha

Statues and ornamentation: deities, demons and mythical beings
Apsara
Erawan
Ganesh
Garuda
Guanyin
Hanuman
Indra
Kinnara
Kirtimukha
Makara
Nāga
Phra Phrom
Rama
Ravana
Shiva
Vishnu
Yaksha

Architectural elements
Bai Sema
Chofa

General
Architecture of Thailand
Buddhism in Thailand
List of Buddhist temples in Thailand
Thai art
Vessantara Jātaka
Ramakien
Sumeru
Himavanta

Sources
Discovery Channel by Scott Rutherford, "Insight Guides: Thailand.", APA Publications GmbH & Co., 2004.
Discovery Channel by Steve Van Beek, "Insight Pocket Guide: Thailand.", APA Publications GmbH & Co., 2004.
Maria Grazia Casella and Paola Piacco, "Thailand: Nature and Wonders.", Asia Books Co,.Ltd., 2004.
John Hoskin and Gerald Cubitt, "This is Thailand.", Asia Books Co., Ltd., 2003

Further reading
 Karl Döhring, Buddhist Temples of Thailand: an Architectonic Introduction, White Lotus, 2000.

External links
Wat Thai: Dhammathai
Thai Arts: Architecture
Thai Temples
Thai Architecture
Buddhist Art: Architecture Pt.1

 
 
Architecture in Thailand
Traditional Thai architecture
Buddhist architecture